The England Boxing National Amateur Championships Bantamweight Championship formerly known as the ABA Championships is the primary English amateur boxing championship. It had previously been contested by all the nations of the United Kingdom.

History
The bantamweight division was inaugurated in 1884 and is currently the weight category of under 54 Kg. Following a re-organisation of weight categories in 2014, it was not held from 2014 until 2021. The championships are highly regarded in the boxing world and seen as the most prestigious national amateur championships.

Past winners

References

England Boxing